Born to Be with You is the fourteenth solo studio album by Dion, released in October 1975. Six of the eight tracks were produced by Phil Spector, who had expressed admiration of Dion's earlier work with his doo-wop group, Dion and the Belmonts.

Upon completion in 1974, Spector himself shelved the release for twelve months, only to find the album was largely met with indifference by the music establishment at the time. However, in the 1990s, the album began to receive widespread critical acclaim. Artists such as Bobby Gillespie of Primal Scream cited it as a key influence.

The album was included in Robert Dimery's 1001 Albums You Must Hear Before You Die.

Production 
The recording sessions were lengthy and chaotic, often hampered by Spector's drinking and unpredictable temperament. Bruce Springsteen and Miami Steve visited the studio during the recording sessions.  On its completion in 1974, Dion effectively disowned the record, stating that the production made it sound like "funeral music".

Track listing 
All tracks produced by Phil Spector, except where noted.

The 2001 Ace Records CD reissue, which pairs Born to Be with You with his 1976 album Streetheart, contains an additional Phil Spector-produced bonus track, "Baby, Let's Stick Together" (3:12, written by Spector and Jeff Barry), which had originally seen release in the UK only as a non-album single in 1976.

Personnel 
 Dion DiMucci – vocals, guitar
 Art Munson, Barney Kessel, Bill Perry, Dan Kessel, Dennis Budimir, Don Peake, Jerry Coe, Jesse Ed Davis, Ron Koss, Thom Rotella & Wally Snow – guitar
 Klaus Voormann, Ray Neopolitan & Ray Pohlman – bass
 Andy Thomas, Barry Mann, Joe Sample, Mike Wofford & Tom Hensley – piano
 Frank Capp, Hal Blaine & Jim Keltner – drums
 Alan Estes, Emil Richards, Gary Coleman, Gene Estes, Jeff Barry, Steve Forman & Terry Gibbs – percussion
 Nino Tempo – saxophone & horn arrangements
 Bobby Keys, Conte Candoli, Don Menza, Fred Selden, Jay Migliori, Jim Horn & Steve Douglas – horns
 James Getzoff Strings – strings
Production credits 
 Phil Gernhard – producer
 Peter Romano, Steve Katz, Stan Ross - engineer
 Phil Spector – producer
 Norman Seeff – photography

References

Further reading 
Phil Spector: Out of His Head. R Williams. 2003. Omnibus Press.

External links 
Album online on Radio3Net a radio channel of Romanian Radio Broadcasting Company

1975 albums
Albums produced by Phil Spector
Dion DiMucci albums